Zakynthos Football Clubs Association (or Zakinthos) ("Zakynthos or Zakinthos F.C.A.", Greek: Ένωση Ποδοσφαιρικών Σωματείων Ζακύνθου Enosi Podosfairikon Somateion Zakynthou) is one of the newest Greek amateur football clubs associations, representing teams from the Greek island of Zakynthos.  The association was founded in 1987 after breaking up from the Elis Football Clubs Association.

Organization
The association is a member of the Hellenic Football Federation and organizes a regional football league and cup.

Championships

For the upcoming season (2011-2012) 29 clubs will take part to the union's championship.
The teams are separated in 2 divisions.

1st Zakynthos Division

12 teams will take part at that division.
The 4 top teams will participate to the Promotion Play-Offs which will have a tournament form, and the winner will be promoted to Delta Ethniki championship.
The 2 bottom teams will be relegated to the lower division while the upper two teams will play a Relegation Play-Off game.

2nd Zakynthos Division

17 teams will take part at that division that year.
The league will be separated into two groups with 9 and 8 teams.
The top three teams of each group will qualify for the Promotion Play-Offs.
The Promotion Play-Offs will have a group form as a small duration championship and will be played in two rounds.
The clubs that will finish in the top three places will be promoted to the upper division.

Zakynthos

Every team that geographically belongs to that union and participates in one of these two championships or even at the Delta Ethniki.

Clubs

1st Zakynthos Division

 Asteras Macherado
 Katastari
 Floga Kypseli
 Ethnikos Skoulikado
 P.A.O.F. Lagkadakia
 Zakynthiakos
 Levantes
 Elatiakos
 Agios Leon
 Apollon Zakynthos
 A.E. Gerakaria
 Thyella Ampelokipoi

2nd Division

Group 1

Aetos Kalipado
Asteras Gaitani
Aris Agios Dimitrios
A.O. Esperos Zakynthos
Achilleas Zakynthos
Asteras Planos
Vanato
O.F.P.E.A.Z.
Koiliomenos

Group 2

 Panarkadikos
 Argasi
 Doxa Lithakia
 Doxa Pigadakia
 Panartemisiakos
 Nea Santa
 Peiratis
 Louros

List of champions

Championships
1988  A.P.S. Zakynthos Unofficial
1989  A.E.S. Esperos
1990  A.P.S. Zakynthos
1991  Angerikos
1992  A.E.S. Esperos
1993  A.P.S. Zakynthos
1994  Angerikos
1995  A.P.S. Zakynthos
1996  Pantokratora AC
1997  A.P.S. Zakynthos
1998  Doxa Lithakia
1999  A.O. Asteras Macherado
2000  A.E. Lagana
2001  A.O.P. Stratos
2002: A.O. Astreas Macherado
2003  Aris Agios Dimitrios
2004  A.O. Tsilivi
2005  A.O. Asteras Macherado
2006  Z.A.G.O.Peiratis Laganas
2007  A.O. Tsilivi
2008  A.O. Katastari
2009  A.O. Tsilivi
2010  A.O.Asteras Macherado
2011  A.O. Tsilivi
2012 Thiella Ampelokipon A.O.
2013 Thiella Ampelokipon A.O.

Cup Zakynthos
Here are cup winners dating back to 1990, a list from 1986 to 1990 are not yet available:

1988 A.P.S. ZakynthosUnofficial
1989 A.P.S. Zakynthos
1990 A.P.S. Zakynthos
1991 A.P.S. Zakynthos - A.P.S. Yakinthos 8-2
1992 A.P.S. Zakynthos
1993 A.P.S. Zakynthos - Pantokratora AC 4-1
1994 A.P.S. Zakynthos - Pantokratora AC 3-1
1995 A.P.S. Zakynthos
1996 A.P.S. Zakynthos - Pantokratosa AC 2-0
1997 A.P.S. Zakynthos - Thyella Ampelokipoi 4-1
1998 A.P.S. Zakynthos - Asteras Macherado 5-1
1999 A.P.S. Zakynthos - Ethnikos Skoulikado 4-1
2000 A.P.S. Zakynthos - A.E. Lagkana 2-1
2001 Asteras Macherado - Katastari AC 4-0
2002 A.P.S. Zakynthos - A.O. Tsilivi 6-1
2003 Asteras Macherado - Aris Agios Dimitrios 5-0
2004 A.P.S Zakynthos
2005 A.P.S. Zakynthos - Asteras Macherado 4-0
2006 A.P.S. Zakynthos - Asteras Macherado 5-1
2007 Z.A.G.O. Piratis Lagana
2008 A.O. Tsilivi
2009 A.O. Katastari
2010 A.O. Tsilivi - Agios Leon 4-2
2011 A.O. Tsilivi
2012 Thiella Ampelokipon A.O.
2013 Thiella Ampelokipon A.O.

References

 rssf

Football
Association football governing bodies in Greece